Toronto Premium Outlets is an outlet mall in Halton Hills, Ontario, Canada.  Being the first Premium Outlet Center in Canada, and the first conglomeration of stores of its type in that nation, the facility opened on Thursday, August 1, 2013. It is anchored by Saks Off 5th and Restoration Hardware.

The mall has 800,000 square feet (74,322 square meters) of shopping including the first ever Hudson's Bay Discount Store, which was replaced by Saks Off Fifth.

Phase 2 of the construction began in 2017 and was completed on November 15, 2018.

See also 

Other outlet malls in the Greater Toronto area:

 Vaughan Mills
 Dixie Outlet Mall

References

External links 
 

Outlet malls in Canada
Power centres (retail) in Canada
Shopping malls in Ontario
Halton Hills
Shopping malls established in 2013
Premium Outlets
2013 establishments in Ontario